Water polo was contested for men only at the 1979 Pan American Games in San Juan, Puerto Rico, Puerto Rico.

Competing teams
Six teams contested the event.

Medalists

References

 Pan American Games water polo medalists on HickokSports

P
1979 Pan American Games
1979
1979